The women's pole vault event at the 2003 European Athletics U23 Championships was held in Bydgoszcz, Poland, at Zawisza Stadion on 17 and 19 July.

Medalists

Results

Final
19 July

v

Qualifications
17 July
Qualifying 4.42 or 12 best to the Final

Group A

Group B

Participation
According to an unofficial count, 24 athletes from 16 countries participated in the event.

 (1)
 (1)
 (3)
 (2)
 (1)
 (1)
 (1)
 (1)
 (1)
 (2)
 (3)
 (1)
 (1)
 (1)
 (3)
 (1)

References

Pole vault
Pole vault at the European Athletics U23 Championships